Ana Flávia Nogueira (born 1974) is a Brazilian chemist who is a professor at the State University of Campinas. Her research considers nanostructured materials for solar applications. She was elected to the Brazilian Academy of Science in 2022.

Early life and education 
Flávia Nogueira was born in Brazil. She earned an undergraduate degree in chemistry at the University of São Paulo, then completed graduate research at the State University of Campinas, where she started investigating polymer electrolytes for dye-sensitized solar cells. Her doctoral research was one of the first in Brazil to make use of dye-sensitized solar cells. She spent part of her PhD at Imperial College London, where she worked with James Durrant on ultrafast laser spectroscopy. After earning her doctorate in 2001, she returned to the Durrant laboratory in London. After leaving London, she worked with Niyazi Serdar Sarıçiftçi, then returned to Brazil in 2003, working in the group of Henrique E. Toma.

Research and career 
Flávia Nogueira established her own research group at the State University of Campinas, where she investigates nanostructure materials for solar applications, with a particular focus on perovskite solar cells. Alongside novel materials science, she developed new measurement techniques. This includes multidimensional coherent spectroscopy, a technique which enables dynamic measurements of electron-light interactions with high temporal precision.

Flávia Nogueira was announced director of CINE, the Center for Innovation in New Energies, in 2020. She was elected to the Brazilian Academy of Science in 2022.

Awards and honours 
 2020 Award for Brazilian Women in Chemistry and Related Sciences
 2022 Elected to the Brazilian Academy of Science

Selected publications

References 

1974 births
Living people
Members of the Brazilian Academy of Sciences
University of São Paulo alumni
Academic staff of the State University of Campinas
Brazilian women chemists
20th-century Brazilian scientists
21st-century Brazilian scientists